The Fourteenth Federal Electoral District of the Federal District (XIV Distrito Electoral Federal del Distrito Federal) is one of the 300 Electoral Districts into which Mexico is divided for the purpose of elections to the federal Chamber of Deputies and one of 27 such districts in the Federal District ("DF" or Mexico City).

It elects one deputy to the lower house of Congress for each three-year legislative period, by means of the first past the post system.

District territory
Under the 2005 districting scheme, the DF's Fourteenth District covers the whole of
the borough (delegación) of Tlalpan,
with the exception of its northernmost portion, which makes up the Fifth District.
It is one of the DF's few rural electoral districts.

Previous districting schemes

1996–2005 district
Between 1996 and 2005, the 14th District covered the westernmost third of the borough of Iztacalco.

Deputies returned to Congress from this district

L Legislature
 1976–1979: Jorge Mendicutti Negrete (PRI)
LI Legislature
 1979–1982: Eduardo Rosas González (PRI)
LII Legislature
 1982–1985: Alvaro Brito Alonso (PRI)
LIII Legislature
 1985–1988:
LIV Legislature
 1988–1991: Jorge Galván Moreno (PAN)
LV Legislature
 1991–1994:
LVI Legislature
 1994–1997: José Castelazo (PRI)
LVII Legislature
 1997–2000: Gilberto López y Rivas (PRD)
LVIII Legislature
 2000–2003: José Benjamín Muciño Pérez (PAN)
LIX Legislature
 2003–2006: Daniel Ordóñez Hernández (PRD)
LX Legislature
 2006–2009: Higinio Chávez García (PRD)

References and notes

Federal electoral districts of Mexico
Mexico City